Weatherscan was an American digital cable and satellite television network owned by Allen Media Group. A spinoff of The Weather Channel, Weatherscan featured uninterrupted local weather information in graphical format on a continuous loop that was generated by an IntelliStar unit installed at the cable provider's headend; unlike The Weather Channel, Weatherscan did not feature on-air talent of any kind.

History

The channel launched on March 31, 1999, as Weatherscan Local. Originally, Weatherscan operated five collective services for local weather information: Weatherscan Local featured animated weather information with a complete local weather segment every two minutes; Weatherscan Radar featured a continuous Doppler radar loop, along with severe weather advisories when warranted; Weatherscan Plus (debuted April 30, 1999) featured activity-specific forecasts for golf, skiing, boating, beachgoing, and business and leisure travel; Weatherscan Plus Traffic (May 31, 1999) featured the same format as Weatherscan Plus with the inclusion of traffic information; Weatherscan Español, which launched with Weatherscan Plus Traffic, was a Spanish-language version of Weatherscan Plus allowing regional or international weather information.

The IntelliStar unit used by Weatherscan was configured differently from that used by The Weather Channel, featuring different graphics and additional forecast products, with information running on a continuous basis. Vocal Local, a pre-recorded narration function installed in the IntelliStar system—which utilizes a different narration track than that used on The Weather Channel's Local on the 8s forecast segments, featuring a female announcer—introduces several of the segments.

At its prime, Weatherscan was available in many major markets around the United States, though its availability was not as widespread as that of parent network The Weather Channel. Many cable providers offered Weatherscan on their digital tiers, although a few providers carry Weatherscan on their basic tier (where The Weather Channel is also offered). In 2011, Dish Network became the first satellite provider to add Weatherscan. Most cable providers that carried the channel had it identified as "Local weather" on their interactive channel guides (Weatherscan was also classified on TV Guide Channel as "Local weather" and/or under various abbreviations of such).

Verizon FiOS dropped Weatherscan, along with parent network The Weather Channel, from its lineup at 12:00 a.m. on March 10, 2015 after the two parties were unable to come to terms on a new carriage agreement. The service has been replaced by the local WeatherBug "widget" in some markets. No public announcement was made regarding this issue until over 12 hours after the discontinuation. Verizon said its reason for dropping the services was because many customers turn to the internet and mobile apps for weather any time of day.

While the domestic IntelliStars were decommissioned and replaced by newer IntelliStar2 units on November 16, 2015, the modified IntelliStar units continued to run Weatherscan until December 12, 2022.

Sale to Entertainment Studios
On March 22, 2018, Byron Allen's Entertainment Studios announced its intent to acquire The Weather Channel's television assets from an NBCUniversal/Blackstone Group partnership. The actual value is undisclosed, but was reported to be around $300 million; the channel's non-television assets, which were separately sold to IBM two years prior, were not included in the sale.

End of operations
In a letter to the National Cable Television Cooperative, which most remaining cable affiliates are part of, dated September 12, 2022, Weather Group Television announced that they would be terminating the Weatherscan service no later than December 9, 2022, with a preference to take it off the air sooner rather than later. Declining viewership, the availability of weather conditions and forecasts through computers as well as smartphone weather apps, and aging equipment were cited as the main reasons that the channel is going offline, making the operations of the once iconic service outdated and no longer necessary. Those same reasons ultimately led to major television providers dropping the channel previously between March 2015 and December 2017. In addition, Weatherscan did not broadcast in HD, which is nearly general for television news and weather in the United States by the time of the shut-down announcement. 

The remaining providers exercised their options to air their in-house local weather services, switch to similar networks such as AccuWeather Network, WeatherNation, or Fox Weather; or delete the channel space entirely. However, Weatherscan has largely been replaced in function with Local Now.

Weatherscan was officially discontinued on December 12, 2022, three days after the original end-of-service date.

Products

Weatherscan displayed a variety of forecast products that show different types of weather information, some of which are not included on certain providers.

During the early 2000s, when the channel's segments were generated mainly by WeatherStar XL systems, up to five different products, excluding the local product, could be chosen for display.

Weatherscan timeline

Note: "Domestic IntelliStar" refers to STARs that output content for The Weather Channel.

National/satellite feed

When Weatherscan Local debuted in 1999, the channel maintained a national feed that was used for satellite and smaller cable providers that could not afford a secondary and more technologically advanced WeatherStar system to use for a local Weatherscan feed. The national feed, branded as simply Weatherscan, debuted in July 1998, and ran current temperatures and extended forecasts for select cities throughout the United States, as well as national and regional radar images. There is uncertainty as to whether or not the national version was discontinued; however, since Weatherscan Local simplified its name to "Weatherscan" in 2003, it is likely the national feed was discontinued around that time.

A new Weatherscan feed launched on June 29, 2011, for Dish Network subscribers, replacing the short-lived service The Weather Cast that had been founded as a replacement for The Weather Channel as a result of a May 2010 carriage dispute with the satellite provider; the Weatherscan feed provides regionalized information for cities within 125 miles of a given area, and is delivered in the same manner as the Weatherscan systems on cable providers. Dish Network dropped Weatherscan on June 24, 2015, while WeatherNation took place for regional viewers.

See also

 The Weather Channel
 IntelliStar
 IntelliStar 2
 IntelliStar 2 Jr.
 Weather Star XL
 WeatherStar
 Weather Star Jr.

References

External links
 

The Weather Channel
Former General Electric subsidiaries
Former Comcast subsidiaries
English-language television stations in the United States
Weather television networks
Television channels and stations established in 1999
Television channels and stations disestablished in 2022
1999 establishments in the United States
2022 disestablishments in the United States
Defunct television networks in the United States
Emulation software